Charles Colin Sinclair (15 June 1890 – 30 August 1970) was an Australian boxer who competed in the 1924 Summer Olympics. In 1924 he was eliminated in the second round of the lightweight class after losing his fight to Alfred Genon.

References

External links
Colin Sinclair's profile at Sports Reference.com

1890 births
1970 deaths
Lightweight boxers
Olympic boxers of Australia
Boxers at the 1924 Summer Olympics
Australian male boxers